Ružomberok District (okres Ružomberok) is a district in
the Žilina Region of central Slovakia. 
Until 1918, the district was part of the county of Kingdom of Hungary of Liptov.

Municipalities 
Bešeňová
Hubová
Ivachnová
Kalameny
Komjatná
Likavka
Liptovská Lúžna
Liptovská Osada
Liptovská Štiavnica
Liptovská Teplá
Liptovské Revúce
Liptovské Sliače
Liptovský Michal
Lisková
Lúčky
Ludrová
Ľubochňa
Martinček
Potok
Ružomberok
Stankovany
Štiavnička
Švošov
Turík
Valaská Dubová

External links 
Official site

Districts of Slovakia
Žilina Region